Christian Noyer (born 6 October 1950) is a French economist who served as Governor of the Bank of France from 2003 to 2015. In this capacity, he chaired the Bank for International Settlements from 2010 until 2015. He had previously served as Vice-President of the European Central Bank from 1998 to 2002.

Career
Appointed to the Treasury in the Ministry of the Economy and Finance in 1976, Noyer subsequently spent two years in Brussels from 1980 to 1982 at France's permanent representation to the European Communities. Back at the Treasury, he held a range of posts dealing with both domestic issues (government cash and debt management, banking affairs, financing of industry and state-owned enterprises) and international affairs (multilateral issues, export financing). In 1995, he became chief of staff to Finance Minister Jean Arthuis.

Noyer was appointed Governor of the Bank of France in 2003 by then-President Jacques Chirac, and confirmed to a second term by his successor Nicolas Sarkozy. During his tenure as Governor, he was also Chairman of the Autorité de contrôle prudentiel et de résolution (ACPR – the French Prudential Supervision and Resolution Authority for banks and insurance). He also chaired the supervisory boards of the Institut d'émission des départements d'Outre-Mer (IEDOM) and the Institut d'émission d'Outre-Mer (IEOM), the French overseas note-issuing central banks.

Later career
In 2014, daily newspaper Le Monde reported that Noyer had been considered to succeed Baudouin Prot as chairman of private bank BNP Paribas; the post instead went to Jean Lemierre.

In 2016, Noyer was appointed by the Government of France to serve on a task force mandated with leading efforts to attract business from London in the wake of Brexit. He also led France's successful bid to relocate the European Banking Authority to Paris in 2017.

In 2018, the French Treasury asked Noyer to study all possible options to reorganize Crédit Mutuel Arkéa, part France's fifth-biggest lender Groupe Crédit Mutuel.

Other activities

International organizations
 International Monetary Fund (IMF), Ex-Officio Alternate Member of the Board of Governors (1993-1995, 2003-2015)
 Financial Stability Board (FSB), Ex-Officio Member (2008-2015)
 World Bank, Ex-Officio Alternate Member of the Board of Governors (1993-1995)

Corporate boards
 Power Corporation of Canada, Member of the Board of Directors (since 2016)

Non-profit organizations
 Group of Thirty, Member
 French Institute of International Relations (IFRI), Member of the Board of Directors
 Club de l'horloge, Member (1974–75).

References

External links
 Short Biography

|-

|-

1950 births
Carrefour de l'horloge people
Commandeurs of the Légion d'honneur
École nationale d'administration alumni
French bankers
French officials of the European Union
Governors of the Banque de France
Living people
People from Soisy-sous-Montmorency
Sciences Po alumni
Vice Presidents of the European Central Bank